Gymnastics competitions at the 2019 European Games in Minsk, Belarus, were held from 22 to 30 June 2019 at the Minsk-Arena. A total of 32 gymnastics events were held in the five disciplines; artistic, rhythmic, trampolining, aerobic and acrobatic.

Qualification
A total of 286 athletes will qualify for the gymnastics competitions. Qualification will be based on the results from the World Championships or European Championships in each discipline.

Timeline

Summary

Medal table

Medal summary

Acrobatic
 Women's groups

Mixed pairs

Aerobic

Artistic
Men's individual

Women's individual

Rhythmic
 Women's individual

Women's group

Trampoline

References

External links
Result Book – Acrobatic Gymnastics
Result Book – Aerobic Gymnastics
Result Book – Artistic Gymnastics
Result Book – Rhythmic Gymnastics
Result Book – Trampoline Gymnastics

 
Sports at the 2019 European Games
European Games
2019
2019